Reed David Larson (born July 30, 1956) is an American former professional ice hockey defenseman and former captain of the Detroit Red Wings who played 904 regular season games in the National Hockey League between 1976 and 1990. He featured in the 1990 Stanley Cup Finals with the Bruins.

He is an honoured member of the United States Hockey Hall of Fame and was a recipient of the Lester Patrick Trophy for his contributions to hockey in the United States.

Youth
Larson grew up in a working-class neighborhood in south Minneapolis, playing hockey at outdoor rinks and practicing his shooting in his garage. In the off-season, he water skied and did gymnastics, developing his arm strength and powerful slap shot. He played for Minneapolis Roosevelt High School and was their leading scorer in the 1973-1974 season when they went to the state tournament.

College career
Larson spent three seasons under coach Herb Brooks at the University of Minnesota's Minnesota Gophers before being drafted by the Detroit Red Wings with the 22nd pick of the 1976 NHL Entry Draft. He was named one of the 50 greatest players in University of Minnesota hockey history as part of the "Legends on Ice" tribute in 2001.

Professional and international career
Larson joined Detroit near the end of the 1976–77 season after Minnesota suspended him for assaulting an official during a WCHA game. He appeared in 14 NHL games that season and was also named to Team USA for the 1977 World Ice Hockey Championships  but missed the tournament due to shoulder injury. His first full NHL season (1977–78) was highly successful  scoring the most points (60) by a rookie defenseman. A tough, offensive defenseman, he was particularly well known for his hard slap shot. Larson became the first American defenseman to score 200 goals and he appeared in the 1978, 1980 and 1981 NHL All-Star Game as the Red Wings representative. He finally made his international debut for the United States national team at the 1981 World Ice Hockey Championships tournament and also represented the U.S. at the 1981 Canada Cup.

Larson spent ten NHL seasons in Detroit until the Red Wings traded him to the Boston Bruins for Mike O'Connell in 1986. He played another two seasons for the Bruins before ending his NHL career in 1989–90 with the Buffalo Sabres His professional career continued overseas in Italy where he was a player-coach for four seasons before returning to his home state for a final nine games for the International Hockey League Minnesota Moose in 1994–95. He also played six games in Roller Hockey International for the Minnesota Arctic Blast in 1994.

Post playing career
Reed Larson has mostly been working for the insurance business since his retirement. He has also been active in Oldtimers' charity hockey and has played in Heroes of Hockey games at several NHL All-Star weekends. He was elected to the United States Hockey Hall of Fame in 1996.

Awards and honors

Member of U.S. Hockey Hall of Fame
Played in NHL All-Star Game (1978, 1980, 1981)

Career statistics

Regular season and playoffs

International

References

External links

Reed Larson's bio at Hockeydraftcentral.com

1956 births
American expatriate sportspeople in Italy
American men's ice hockey defensemen
Boston Bruins players
Buffalo Sabres players
Courmaosta HC players
Detroit Red Wings captains
Detroit Red Wings draft picks
Detroit Red Wings players
Edmonton Oilers players
HC Alleghe players
Lester Patrick Trophy recipients
Living people
Maine Mariners players
HC Milano Saima players
Minnesota Arctic Blast players
Minnesota Fighting Saints draft picks
Minnesota Golden Gophers men's ice hockey players
Minnesota Moose players
Minnesota North Stars players
National Hockey League All-Stars
New York Islanders players
United States Hockey Hall of Fame inductees
Ice hockey people from Minneapolis
NCAA men's ice hockey national champions
Roosevelt High School (Minnesota) alumni